The Amazon climbing salamander (Bolitoglossa palmata), also known as the Amazon mushroomtongue salamander, is a species of salamander in the family Plethodontidae. It is found on the Amazonian slopes of the Andes of Ecuador and southern Colombia. Its natural habitats are cloud forests. It is threatened by habitat loss and contamination from agricultural operations.

References

Bolitoglossa
Amphibians of the Andes
Amphibians of Colombia
Amphibians of Ecuador
Taxonomy articles created by Polbot
Amphibians described in 1897